Caffiers is a railway station naer the village Caffiers, Pas-de-Calais, northern France. It is located on the Boulogne–Calais railway and served by the SNCF local TER Hauts-de-France.

TER
TER Hauts-de-France services run southwards to Boulogne-Ville and northwards to Calais-Ville.

References

Railway stations in Pas-de-Calais